Sale is a tram stop on the Altrincham Line of the Metrolink light-rail system in Sale, Greater Manchester, England. It opened on 15 June 1992 as part of Phase 1 of Metrolink's expansion. Prior to this, it was a railway station on the Manchester, South Junction and Altrincham Railway (MSJAR) line. It was built by John Brogden, who was a local builder in the Sale area.

History

The station originally opened as Sale on 20 July 1849 by the MSJAR. Renamed as Sale Moor in 1856, as Sale & Ashton on Mersey in 1883 and as Sale in 1931. It closed as a British Rail station on 24 December 1991 and reopened as a Metrolink station on 15 June 1992.

Sale tram stop briefly appears during the opening titles of Pro Evolution Soccer 2, which was released in 2002.

Services
Sale is on the Altrincham Line, with trams towards Altrincham stopping every 6 minutes during the day, Mondays to Saturdays, every 12 minutes Monday to Saturday evenings and Sundays. Trams also head towards Manchester and Bury, with the Monday to Saturday daytime service running every 12 minutes each to Etihad Campus or Bury, while evening and Sunday journeys run to Etihad Campus only, with journeys to Bury requiring a change of trams at Piccadilly Gardens.

Service pattern 
10 trams per hour to Altrincham (5 off-peak)
5 trams per hour to Bury (peak only)
5 trams per hour to Piccadilly

Ticket zones 
As of January 2019, Sale is located in Metrolink ticket zone 3.

Connecting bus routes
Sale tram stop is well served by bus services, due to the close proximity to the town centre, with several services stopping outside and some  stopping around the town centre.

Services that stop outside the station:
Arriva North West service 19 to Altrincham via Ashton-upon-Mersey
Go North West CrossCity 41 to Middleton via Northenden and Fallowfield, Manchester city centre, Cheetham Hill and North Manchester General Hospital.
Diamond Bus North West services 18, 262, 281 and X5.

References

Further reading

External links

Sale Stop Information
Sale area map
Sale Tram Stop Map

Tram stops in Trafford
Former Manchester, South Junction and Altrincham Railway stations
Tram stops on the Altrincham to Bury line
Railway stations in Great Britain opened in 1849
Railway stations in Great Britain closed in 1991
Railway stations in Great Britain opened in 1992
Tram stops on the Altrincham to Piccadilly line
Sale, Greater Manchester
1849 establishments in England